The 2017–18 Armenia Basketball League A season, was the inaugural season of the new official competition of basketball first division in Armenia.

Artsakh won the title after doing a perfect 6–0 in the playoffs.

Competition format
After several negotiations, finally seven teams joined the competition, consisting in a round-robin tournament where the best teams would qualify for the playoffs. The best teams are able for qualifying to the European competitions.

The regular season consisted in a double-legged round-robin tournament where the first qualified would join directly the semifinals. The other six teams would face in the quarterfinals.

Teams

Seven teams took part in the inaugural season of the competition.

Regular season
The regular season started on 21 October 2017 and ended on 20 February 2018.

League table

Results

Playoffs
Playoffs started on 2 March 2018. Urartu, as winner of the regular season, was directly qualified for the semifinals. Teams that placed better at the end of the regular season played games 1 and 3 at home.

The final was played in a double-legged format at the Mika Sports Arena, Yerevan. These games were played on 14 and 18 April 2018.

Final standings

References

External links
Armenian basketball at Eurobasket.com
Basketball Federation of Armenia at Facebook

Armenian
Armenia Basketball League A